The Basketmakers' Kiosk, also known as Sepetçiler Palace (Sepetçiler Kasrı), named after the Sepetçiler Roma (basketmakers), is a former Ottoman pleasure palace located on the southern shore of Golden Horn's mouth at Sarayburnu in the neighborhood of Sirkeci in Istanbul, Turkey.

History 
Built in 1591 by Sultan Murad III, for the Sepetçi Romanlar, (Muslim basketmakers Roma), where they could sell their goods, and renovated by Sultan Mahmud I in 1739, it is the only surviving building from a row of many assorted pavilions and palaces constructed within the outer yard of Topkapı Palace. According to the text on the epigraph on the door arch of the pavilion, the pavilion, which was located within the borders of Topkapı Palace in the era when it was constructed, was reconstructed in 1643 in Sultan Ibrahim’s era (1640–1658), The Sepetçiler Kasrı have taken its name from the basketmaker tradesmen working in that region. According to the rumor, the tradesmen shared the construction costs of the pavilion and gave their names to the building as a means of gratitude to Sultan Ibrahim, who was under his patronage and was known for his interest in basketry.and renewed in 1739 in Sultan Mahmut I’s era (1730–1754).

Serving initially as the government's Foreign Press Office and International Press Center following its recent renovation in 1980, the prominent place with its indoor and open-air facilities for meetings and banquets was once managed by Swissôtel.

The imperial structure, a former part of the Topkapı Palace complex, is situated on top of the ancient Golden Horn Wall at Marmaroporta ("Marble Gate") just below Topkapı Palace. It was erected next to, yet no more existing, Yalı Köşkü, a waterfront pavilion, which was built by Selim I and served to many sultans as a place for reception of Kapudan Pashas (fleet admirals) and for salutation of the fleet before setting sail to a campaign or after returning from a campaign.

The palace on four floors with thick stone-built walls has spacious halls with high wooden doors. It has a panoramic view to the Galata Bridge, the Galata Tower, Karaköy and the Bosphorus. The building was turned into a warehouse after alterations made in the 19th century. During the Republic era, it was used as an army pharmacy and then left empty until its restoration in the late 1980s. Renovation work, carried out with reference to old pictures, enabled the restoration of the building to its original state.

Having been abandoned for a long period of time, the building was restored by the Directorate General of Old Works and Museums in 1980. After restorations, it was used as the International Press Centre of the General Directorate of Press and Information. The Eminonu Service Foundation restored the pavilion in 1998. Sepetçiler Pavilion has served in various capacities, such as a restaurant in addition to as the Directorate General of Press, and was used as the Project Office of European Capital of Culture until June 2011.

Turkish Green Crescent Headquarters 
Allocated to Turkish Green Crescent Society as of 2011, Sepetçiler Pavilion is now used as the General Headquarters building of the Turkish Green Crescent Society. The Green Crescent is a non-profit and non-governmental organization that empowers youth and adults with factual information about drugs so they can make informed decisions against different kind of addictions including alcohol, tobacco, drug, and gambling. The Green Crescent was established in 1920 and given the status of Public-Beneficial Society (public beneficial society status is given to the organizations that serve for public benefits) by the Turkish government in 1934.

See also 
 Ottoman architecture

References

Literature 
 Fanny Davis. Palace of Topkapi in Istanbul. 1970. ASIN B000NP64Z2

External links 

Topkapı Palace
Restaurants in Istanbul
Music venues in Istanbul
Houses completed in 1592
Redevelopment projects in Istanbul
Fatih